Qatar competed at the 2004 Summer Paralympics in Athens, Greece. The team included two athletes, both of them men, and won no medals.

Sports

Athletics

Powerlifting

See also
Qatar at the Paralympics
Qatar at the 2004 Summer Olympics

References 

Nations at the 2004 Summer Paralympics
2004
Summer Paralympics